Bankraub in der Rue Latour is a 1961 West German comedy film directed by and starring Curd Jürgens.

Cast
 Curd Jürgens as Cliff MacHardy
 Ingeborg Schöner as Maskottchen
 Charles Régnier as Camarro
 Klaus Kinski as Bex, Author
 Peer Schmidt as Alex
 Helmut Alimonta as Ganove
 Almut Berg as Marie-Louise
 Tania Corvin as Starlett
 Ursula Herking as Putzfrau
 Bum Krüger as Kassierer
 Carl Lange as Regisseur Bergström
 Christiane Nielsen as Gloria
 Fritz Remond as Manchette
 Otto Stern as Freddy, Mann mit Homburg
 Erika von Thellmann as Prinzessin Caraconne
 Herbert Weissbach as Bankdirektor

References

External links

1961 films
1961 comedy films
1960s crime comedy films
1960s heist films
West German films
German crime comedy films
1960s German-language films
German black-and-white films
Films directed by Curd Jürgens
Films set in Paris
1960s German films